"Nice 'n' Sleazy" is a single by The Stranglers from the 'white' side of their 1978 album, Black and White. It reached number 18 in the UK Singles Chart. The single's cover pictured a victim of the Boston Strangler.

Strippers embellished the song during the band's headline set at Battersea Park on 16 September 1978. "The Stranglers booked some strippers to up the show's visual aspect," recalled photographer Barry Plummer. "But some of the lads in the audience got a bit carried away and also stripped completely naked. Eventually the police were called and took down all of the young ladies' particulars."

Cultural references
A punk festival named after the song is held annually in Morecambe, Lancashire.

A bar located on Glasgow's Sauchiehall Street is named after the song. It was first opened in 1991.

Charts

References

External links
 [ Allmusic review]
 

The Stranglers songs
1978 singles
Song recordings produced by Martin Rushent
1978 songs
United Artists Records singles
Songs written by Hugh Cornwell
Songs written by Dave Greenfield
Songs written by Jet Black
Songs written by Jean-Jacques Burnel